Keenen Ivory Desuma Wayans (born June 8, 1958) is an American actor, comedian, and filmmaker. He is a member of the Wayans family of entertainers. Wayans first came to prominence as the host and the creator of the 1990–1994 Fox sketch comedy series In Living Color. He has produced, directed and/or written several films, starting with Hollywood Shuffle, which he cowrote, in 1987.

A majority of his films have included him and one or more of his brothers and sisters in the cast.

One of these films, Scary Movie (2000), which Wayans directed, was the highest-grossing movie directed by an African American until it was surpassed by Tim Story's Fantastic Four in 2005. From 1997 to 1998, he hosted the talk show The Keenen Ivory Wayans Show. Most recently, he was a judge for the eighth season of Last Comic Standing.

Life and career
Wayans was born in Harlem, New York City, son of Howell Stouten Wayans, a supermarket manager, and his wife Elvira Alethia (Green), a homemaker and social worker. He was born the second of ten children. Genealogical TV show Finding Your Roots revealed that his paternal line traced back to Madagascar. His father was a devout Jehovah's Witness. The family later moved to  Manhattan's Fulton housing projects, where he primarily grew up. He attended Seward Park High School during his teenage years, and attended Tuskegee University on an engineering scholarship. He entertained his friends at college with made-up stories about life in New York. One semester before graduation, he dropped out of school to focus on comedy.

During his first set performing at The Improv in New York, Wayans met Robert Townsend, who helped him learn about the comedy business. Townsend and Wayans drove cross country to Los Angeles together when Wayans moved to Los Angeles in 1980. Wayans worked there as an actor. He had a regular role as a soldier on a television series titled For Love and Honor.  He also appeared on Hill Street Blues as a famous NFL linebacker.

Townsend wrote, directed, and starred in the movie Hollywood Shuffle; Wayans was costar and cowriter. The movie's success allowed him to raise the money to make I'm Gonna Git You Sucka. Fox Broadcasting Company approached Wayans to offer him his own show. Wayans wanted to produce a variety show similar to Saturday Night Live, with a cast of people of color that took chances with its content.

Fox gave Wayans a lot of freedom with the show, although Fox executives were a bit concerned about the show's content before its television debut. Wayans created, wrote, and starred in the show, titled In Living Color, a sketch comedy television series that originally ran on the Fox Network from 1990 to 1994.

Wayans is a vegetarian, and has promoted the diet in a public service announcement of 2006 for the Physicians Committee for Responsible Medicine.

In Living Color

Characters
Death Row Comic (Prison Cable Access)
Frenchie
Ice Man (Homeboy Shopping Network)
Tom Brothers (The Brothers Brothers)
Wes (Wes & Les)

Impressions
Arsenio Hall
Billy Dee Williams
Don Cornelius
Jesse Jackson
Little Richard
Mike Tyson
Marsha Warfield
Milli (Rob Pilatus) of Milli Vanilli
Morgan Freeman (Damon Wayans was Hoke Coburn from Driving Miss Daisy/Riding Miss Daisy, Principal Joe Clark from Lean on Me)
Rick James
Steve Harvey
Carl Weathers (as Apollo Creed)

Filmography

Writing/producing/directing credits

References

External links

1958 births
American male film actors
American people of Malagasy descent
African-American male comedians
American male comedians
African-American film directors
Comedy film directors
Parody film directors
American parodists
African-American screenwriters
Screenwriters from New York (state)
American sketch comedians
Emmy Award winners
Film directors from New York City
American male screenwriters
African-American television producers
Television producers from New York City
American television talk show hosts
Late night television talk show hosts
American television writers
Living people
Male actors from New York City
Keenen Ivory
African-American television talk show hosts
African-American male actors
American male television actors
American male television writers
Comedians from New York City
20th-century American comedians
21st-century American comedians
Film producers from New York (state)
People from Chelsea, Manhattan
Seward Park High School alumni
20th-century African-American people
21st-century African-American people
African-American male writers